Darkhiz (also Romanized as Darkhīz; also known as Bāb-e Havīz, Bāb Hariz, Bāb Havīz, and Darkhīz Bāb Havīz) is a village in Jorjafak Rural District, in the Central District of Zarand County, Kerman Province, Iran. At the 2006 census, its population was 81, in 21 families.

References 

Populated places in Zarand County